Wrightiadione is an isoflavone that occurs in the plant Wrightia tomentosa and can also be synthesized. It is a novel template for the TrkA kinase inhibitors.

References 

Isoflavones